was a town located in Uda District, Nara Prefecture, Japan.

As of 2005, the town had an estimated population of 4,746 and a density of 170.84 persons per km². The total area was 27.78 km².

On January 1, 2006, Utano, along with the towns of Haibara and Ōuda, and the village of Murō (all from Uda District), was merged to create the city of Uda.

Dissolved municipalities of Nara Prefecture
Populated places disestablished in 2006
2006 disestablishments in Japan
Uda, Nara